USS Callisto (AGP-15) was a  built for the United States Navy during World War II.

Construction
Callisto was laid down 31 October 1944, at Hingham, Massachusetts, by the Bethlehem-Hingham Shipyard; launched 29 November; and commissioned 22 December 1944 for transit to its fitting out yard. Recommissioned 12 June 1945, after conversion to a Motor Torpedo Boat Tender (AGP).

Service history
After brief service for the US Navy, it was decommissioned 9 May 1946, and laid up in the Pacific Reserve Fleet. Callisto was transferred to the Maritime Commission (MARCOM) 14 May 1948, and laid up in the National Defense Reserve Fleet. It was later sold for merchant service and renamed Elena then Daytona before being lost by unknown causes on 20 November 1955.

Callisto sailed from Yorktown, Virginia, on 23 July 1945, bound for the Pacific and service with the 7th Fleet. Delayed at Pearl Harbor, by the cessation of hostilities, it reported at San Pedro Bay, Philippines, on 15 October, to serve as tender to Motor Torpedo Boat Squadron 9, busy with the varied tasks given these speedy craft as normal life was restored to the Philippines. Callisto provided berthing, maintenance, and supply facilities for its assigned squadron until 20 December, when it cleared for San Francisco.

Notes

Citations

Bibliography 

Online resources

External links
 

 

Portunus-class motor torpedo boat tenders
Portunus-class motor torpedo boat tenders converted from LST-542-class ships
Ships built in Sparrows Point, Maryland
1944 ships
World War II auxiliary ships of the United States
Maritime incidents in 1955